The 1998 Intercontinental Cup was an association football match played on 1 December 1998 between Real Madrid, winners of the 1997–98 UEFA Champions League, and Vasco da Gama, winners of the 1998 Copa Libertadores. The match was played at a neutral venue, the National Stadium in Tokyo, in front of 51,514 fans. Real Madrid forward Raúl was named as man of the match.
 Raul's game winning goal is widley recognized as one of the best of his career, and became known as the "Gol del Aguanis".

Venue

Match

Details

See also
1997–98 UEFA Champions League
1998 Copa Libertadores
Real Madrid CF in international football competitions

References

External links
FIFA Article (Archived)
Copa Europea/Sudamericana - Toyota: Real Madrid 2 - Vasco da Gama 1, CONMEBOL.com

Intercontinental Cup
Intercontinental Cup
Intercontinental Cup
1998
Intercontinental Cup 1998
Intercontinental Cup 1998
Intercontinental Cup (football) matches hosted by Japan
Intercontinental Cup
Intercontinental Cup
December 1998 sports events in Asia
Sports competitions in Tokyo
1998 in Tokyo
1998 in association football